Auqaf and Religious Affairs Department is a department of Government of Punjab, Pakistan. 
Auqaf & Religious Department is headed by the Secretary Auqaf & Religious Affairs who is assisted by the Additional Secretary and the Deputy Secretary. The department is governed under Punjab Waqf Properties Ordinance, 1979.. The current minister for Religious Affairs and Auqaf is Peer Syed Saeed ul Hassan Shah since 13 September 2018.

Organization
The Department Organization comprises the following six Directorates:
 Directorate of Administration
 Directorate of Estate
 Directorate of Finance
 Directorate of Religious Affairs
 Directorate of Projects
 Directorate of Health Services

Functions
Functions of department include:
 Administration of the Punjab Waqf Properties
 Mosques, shrines and other religious institutions under the control of the Chief Administrator of Auqaf, Punjab, except Historical monuments
 Management of and repairs of Badshahi Mosque, Lahore
 Hajj Affairs coordination with the Federal Govt

Welfare services
Auqaf Department maintains 1 Hospital and 14 dispensaries in the Punjab.

See also 
 Ministry of Religious Affairs
 Minority Affairs Department, Sindh
 Islam in Pakistan

External links
 Auqaf and Religious Affairs Department

References

Islam in Pakistan
Departments of Government of Punjab, Pakistan